The National Airline of Iran, branded as Iran Air, is the flag carrier of Iran, which is headquartered at Mehrabad Airport in Tehran. As of 2018, it operates scheduled services to 71 destinations in Asia and Europe. Iran Air's main bases are Tehran International Airport and Mehrabad Airport, both situated in Tehran, the capital of Iran.
Domestically, Iran Air is commonly known as Homa, which is the name of a mythical Persian phoenix or griffin, and also the acronym of Iran National Airlines in the Persian language. The airline's cargo division, Iran Air Cargo, operates scheduled  services internationally using one cargo aircraft.

History

Early years

Iranian Airways was founded in May 1944 by Reza Afshar and Gholam Ebtehaj. Post-war, its first passenger flight was from Tehran to Mashhad, followed by a Tehran-Esfahan-Shiraz-Bushehr-Abadan-Ahwaz service. In 1946 the airline established service to Cairo, Baghdad, and Tel Aviv, and in April 1947, to Paris. Between 1945 and 1962, the airline became a major domestic carrier, also operating some international flights to Europe each week. The fleet consisted of Douglas DC-3s initially, supplemented by Douglas DC-4 and Vickers Viscount aircraft later on.

In 1954, the privately-owned airline Persian Air Services (PAS) was established. PAS initially operated only freight services, followed by passenger operations between Tehran and other major cities in Iran. In 1960, PAS initiated passenger service to several European destinations, including Geneva, Paris, Brussels and London, using Boeing 707 and Douglas DC-7 aircraft leased from Sabena.

Iranian Airways was nationalized in 1961. On 24 February 1961, Iranian Airways and PAS merged to form the Iran National Airlines Corporation (HOMA), known as Iran Air, using the Homa bird as a symbol. HOMA was a public sector venture that combined the two predecessor air carriers. Among the aircraft used were Avro Yorks, Douglas DC-3s, Douglas DC-6s, and Vickers Viscounts. The carrier became a full member of the International Air Transport Association (IATA) in 1964. Iran Air and South African Airways were the launch customers for the Boeing 747SP.

Rise to global prominence

In 1965, Iran Air took delivery of its first jet aircraft, the Boeing 707 and the Boeing 727-100, followed by the Boeing 737-200 in 1971, the stretched Boeing 727-200 in 1974, and three variants of Boeing 747 (747-100, −200 and SP), starting in 1978–1979. By the mid-1970s, Iran Air was serving cities in Europe with non-stop and one-stop flights, including over 30 flights a week to London alone.

On 29 May 1971, the Tehran to New York City route was inaugurated, using Boeing 707s making a stop-over at London Heathrow Airport. Shortly thereafter, the route was upgraded to a non-stop flight using Boeing 747SPs, making Iran Air the second Middle Eastern carrier (after El Al), to offer non-stop service to New York. With this flight, Iran Air set a new world record in time and distance for a non-stop, scheduled long-haul flight (12 hours and 15 minutes, 9,867 km – 6,131 mi – 5,328 nm). In 1978, the airline acquired six Airbus A300 aircraft for use on its domestic trunk and busy regional routes. By the end of that year, Iran Air was serving 31 international destinations stretching from New York City to Peking and Tokyo. Plans were made to offer direct services to Los Angeles and to Sydney, for which the airline's long range Boeing 747SP aircraft were ideal. This would have allowed Iran Air to use Tehran as a midway point between East and West, because of its favorable geographical location. Such plans were never realized but bears considerable resemblance to the hub-and-spoke strategies adopted by the ME3 carriers and Turkish Airlines.

By the late 1970s, Iran Air was the fastest growing airline in the world and one of the most profitable. By 1976, Iran Air was ranked second only to Qantas, as the world's safest airline, having been accident free for at least ten consecutive years. Although both airlines were accident free, Iran Air came second only because of fewer operational hours flown compared to Qantas. Prior to this ranking, a fatal accident had occurred on 25 December 1952, in which 24 of the 25 passengers on board perished when their Douglas DC-3 crashed on landing.

Lt. Gen. Ali-Mohammad Khademi was the general manager of Iran Air from 1962 to 1978.

The Iranian Revolution

As a result of economic sanctions against Iran, Iran Air was unable to expand or replace its fleet. The last time Iran Air was delivered brand-new Western aircraft prior to the 2016 lifting of nuclear-related sanctions was in 1994 when it received two Airbus A300-B4s in compensation for the downing of Iran Air Flight 655 by an American cruiser in 1988.

In 2001, Iran Air purchased six second-hand Airbus A300s from Turkey, but only after two years, all six of them ended up grounded at airports in Tehran, Mashhad and Moscow. This caused significant controversy in Iran where officials cited GE engine design flaw and subsequent overheating as the reason for grounding the planes. One of these six planes was later confirmed to have returned to service by 2010.

Prior to the separation of Iran Air Tours from Iran Air in 2011, Russian-made Tupolev Tu-154s formed the backbone of the former's fleet. However, several successive disasters involving this plane ultimately led to a 2011 blanket ban on its operations within Iranian airlines, including Iran Air Tours. The Tu-154 fleet was gradually replaced with MD-83s over the course of a few months.

According to Iran's Deputy Minister of Roads and Urban  Development, Iran currently  has more than 100 planes, some of them owned by Iran Air, grounded due to the lack of access to new parts and technical expertise during the sanctions era.

The prolonged period of time that Iran Air was under international sanctions and barred from purchasing spare parts and new planes led to a dramatic rise in its average fleet age and plunging safety record, to the extent where it became widely known as one of the worst airlines in the world in terms of air safety record. As of March 2017, Iran Air's average fleet age stands at 24.1 years, though this figure is set to improve through addition of new deliveries.

Iran Air's extremely subpar on-time performance, amongst those of most other Iranian airlines, has led to public anger and frustration, often inciting protests in the form of violent confrontations with the airline employees or airplane sit-ins for many hours after a severely-delayed flight has finally landed. Officials routinely attribute the delays to the economic sanctions, although at least one pro-revolutionary ideologue has cited "inefficiency and mismanagement" as the chief cause of this issue.

EU ban and refueling issues

On 5 July 2010, an aviation official of Iran accused the UK, Germany and the United Arab Emirates of refusing to refuel Iranian passenger jets. This move followed unilateral sanctions imposed by the US over the nuclear weapons dispute. Iran Air and Mahan Air both claimed to have been denied refuelling. A spokeswoman for Abu Dhabi Airports Company (ADAC) said that a contract was in place to refuel Iranian passenger flights and ADAC would continue to do so. A spokesperson for the United Kingdom Civil Aviation Authority said that it was the sole decision of independent suppliers if aircraft were to be refuelled or not. Germany's Transport Ministry said the refuelling of Iranian aircraft was not banned under EU or UN sanctions but did not say whether any independent refuellers were denying refuelling. Later in the day, Dubai Airport revealed that it continued to refuel Iranian passengers flights in and out of Dubai. The next day, a spokesperson for Iran said that no such limitation had been imposed.

On 6 July 2010, it was announced that the European Commission would ban all of Iran Air's Airbus A320, Boeing 727 and Boeing 747 fleet from the EU over safety concerns. This move came as a major blow to Iran Air, limiting flights to Europe with its own aircraft.

In 2012, the EU re-allowed the refuelling of Iran Air aircraft at secondary European airports such as Ljubljana and Budapest, in an effort to retain the refuelling contracts within the EU, rather than letting them go to Serbia or later Belarus and Ukraine.

In January 2012, Iran Air's flights to and from London Heathrow operated with a fuel stop at Manston Airport in Kent. However, the airport announced in December 2011 that this arrangement was to end and it would no longer refuel the company's aircraft. This announcement swiftly followed the closure of Iran's embassy in London as the consequence of the ransacking of the British embassy in Tehran. The airport stressed that it had not breached any trade agreements, as it had no connections with the US.

Lifting of sanctions and modernization plans

In anticipation of a deal being reached for the lifting of sanctions, the chairman of Iran Air, Farhad Parvaresh, stated that the airline would then seek to obtain at least 100 wide-body and short-haul jets.

On Friday 15 January 2016 US president Barack Obama authorized his secretary of state, John Kerry, to lift the sanctions on Iran civil aviation. Following Iran's implementation of the Joint Comprehensive Plan of Action (JCPOA) on 16 January 2016, all sanctions on Iran civil aviation were lifted. As a result, Iranian airlines, including Iran Air, were granted permission to purchase new civil aircraft from any manufacturer as well as to refuel at all European airports, except for two Swedish destinations, Stockholm and Gothenburg, due to the fuel supplier BP still refusing to provide fuel to the Iranian carriers.

On 24 January 2016 Tehran hosted the CAPA Iran Aviation Summit organised by CAPA - Centre for Aviation in order to bring both Iranian and international aviation authorities together for considering development plans for Iran's aviation industry. CAPA put the size of Iran's economy somewhere between those of Turkey and Australia, whose commercial airline fleets are in the order of 500-600 aircraft. Bombardier presented its regional models during the CAPA summit in Tehran.
 In a statement, Mr. Parvaresh announced that his airline expected to spend some 3-5 billion US dollars purchasing regional aircraft from manufacturers Airbus, Boeing, Bombardier and Embraer.

Second sanctions
On 8 May 2018, following US withdrawal from the Iran nuclear deal, and as part of the reinstatement of the United States sanctions against Iran lifted in 2015, US Treasury Secretary Steven Mnuchin announced the decision to revoke all Iran sales licenses already granted to plane manufacturers Boeing and Airbus after a 90-day period.

It was announced that Iran Air had to cancel the order for Boeing aircraft due to President Trump's decision to reimpose sanctions against Iran, despite this it has been announced that Iran Air will still be receiving ATR aircraft. It has not yet been announced if Airbus aircraft will still be delivered. Any aircraft being delivered to Iran Air must be delivered within a 90 to 180 day period before the sanctions begin.

While members of the Trump administration have advised European companies to stop doing business with Iran now, Federica Mogherini said the European aim was "maintaining and deepening economic relations with Iran. "The technical experts plan to propose ways to avert disruptions in air, sea and land transport from and to Iran and keep channels open for "effective banking transactions."

Onboard restrictions

Food and beverages

Iran Air is one of the few airlines in the world that, pursuant to Islamic law, does not serve alcoholic beverages on any of its flights. Moreover, there is no choice of non-Halal food selections, such as those containing pork, on Iran Air's menu. This is a policy similar to many other airlines based in predominantly Muslim countries.

Destinations

Iran Air serves destinations in Iran, Asia, the Middle East and Europe.

Pilgrims and Hajj
Until 2016, Hajj charter operations formed a major part of Iran Air's annual activities. Every year, tens of thousands of pilgrims flew from major cities in Iran to Jeddah, Saudi Arabia's air gateway to Mecca, to take part in pilgrimage ceremonies. In 2016, due to escalating tensions between Iran and Saudi Arabia, all Hajj flights from Iran were suspended indefinitely. These flights resumed from 2017.

Codeshare agreements
Iran Air has codeshare agreements with the following airlines:
Austrian Airlines
 Lufthansa

Fleet

Current fleet 
As of June 2021, the Iran Air fleet consists of the following aircraft, several of which might be stored or taken into service on short notice:

Future fleet plans

Airbus
In January 2016 Iran Air signed an agreement for 118 Airbus aircraft, consisting of several types of the manufacturer's twin-engine aircraft and 12 A380s. On 22 December 2016, Airbus announced a firm deal for 100 aircraft comprising 46 Airbus A320 family, A320neo family aircraft; 16 A350s, and 38 A330s /A330neos. In January 2017, Airbus began the delivery process starting with an A321 followed by 2 A330-200s, all initially ordered by and built for Avianca but never delivered.

In January 2018, the sales chief of Airbus signalled that the delivery of the orders placed by Iran Air could deviate from the original schedule due to financing and pre-payment obstacles.

ATR
On 1 February 2016, Iran Air signed an agreement with aircraft manufacturer ATR, covering an order of twenty ATR 72-600 turboprop aircraft plus options for twenty more. Iran Air intends to use the ATR 72s as part of its strategy to expand its domestic market reach and to provide service to the smaller airports that are located in less populated cities of Iran. Deliveries were planned to begin in early 2017 but were delayed due to a stall in talks with the Canadian manufacturer of ATR power plants, Pratt & Whitney Canada, over after-sales support and maintenance for the engines. In the event, the first four aircraft were delivered in a single convoy on 16 May 2017. In April 2019, the US Office of Foreign Assets Control (OFAC) issued a two-year licence to ATR to allow it to supply spare parts and other essentials to keep the fleet of 13 ATR 72-600s in operation. However, the remaining 7 ATR 72-600s from the 2016 order remain sanctioned and in storage.

Boeing
In June 2016, Iran Air officially announced that it was in talks with Boeing for a possible order "close in size to the 118 Airbus aircraft agreement". On 21 June 2016 Boeing announced it has signed a tentative agreement to sell jetliners to Iran, in what would be one of the Islamic Republic's biggest deals with a U.S. manufacturer since trade sanctions on Tehran were eased. On 11 December 2016, Boeing announced a provisional order by Iran Air for eighty aircraft, subject to "contingencies [being] cleared"; the order comprises 50 737 MAX 8s, 15 777-300ERs and 15 777-9s.

In April 2018, Boeing CEO announced the deferral of Iran Air deliveries until at least 2019, citing 
compliance with US government process.

In June 2018, Boeing announced it will not be able to deliver any planes to Iranian airlines because of the sanctions.

Former fleet

Iran Air has previously operated the following aircraft:

Concorde order

On 8 October 1972, Iran Air placed an order with British Aircraft Corporation for two Aérospatiale-BAC Concorde supersonic jets plus an option for one, rendering it the last airline to place Concorde orders for commercial use. However, Iran Air - having had briefly chartered one Concorde jet on flights between Tehran and Paris - cancelled these orders in April 1980.

Former subsidiaries

Iran Air Tours
Iran Air Tours  was founded in 1973 as a wholly owned subsidiary of Iran Air, focusing on charter flights and tourism. In 2011, the company was purchased by Hesayar Cooperative Company, itself a subsidiary of the Ministry of Defense and Armed Forces Logistics. However, Hesayar failed to meet its financial commitments and the airline promptly returned to private hands in 2016. The airline will increase the number of flights from Isfahan and Shiraz airports to Kuwait International Airport as of April 17, 2022.

Homa Hotel Group
Homa Hotel Group was founded in 1979 by the Government of Iran after it completed a nationalization of the hotel industry. As of 2016, it was owned by Iran's Social Security Organization.

Accidents and incidents

Overview
Before the two companies merged in 1962 to form Iran Air, Iranian Airways and Persian Air Services had several aircraft hull losses. Iranian Airways lost six Douglas DC-3s in crashes and a fire between 1949 and 1959; and one of its Douglas DC-4s was shot down in 1961; while Persian Air Services lost three Avro Yorks in crashes and a maintenance accident between 1955 and 1959. Since 1962, Iran Air has had more than a dozen aircraft hull losses in crashes and the shooting-down of Iran Air Flight 655; the airline has also experienced twenty hijacking incidents on its aircraft.

Notable incidents
 On 14 September 1950, an Iranian Airways Douglas DC-3, registration EP-AAG, bound for Saudi Arabia, crashed shortly after taking off from Tehran Mehrabad International Airport. The nine people on board, all employees of the airline, were killed.
 On 25 December 1952, an Iranian Airways Douglas DC-3 with twenty-one passengers and a crew of four on board crashed while on approach to Tehran airport. There was one survivor.
 On the evening of 21 January 1980, a Boeing 727-100 operating as Iran Air Flight 291 hit high ground north of Tehran in a snowstorm during its landing approach to Tehran's Mehrabad Airport, after the pilot failed to follow the correct path to the runway. All 128 passengers and crew on board were killed.
 On 3 July 1988, Iran Air Flight 655 was flying over the Persian Gulf on its way to Dubai from Bandar Abbas. According to the U.S. version of events, the crew of the United States Navy cruiser  mistook the airliner for an Iranian Air Force Grumman F-14 Tomcat jet fighter and the cruiser shot the airliner down with a missile, killing all 16 crew and 274 passengers. Iran maintains it was an intentional act of barbarism.
 On 9 June 1996 a Boeing 727-200 on a pilot training flight landed on its belly at Rasht Airport on its fifteenth touch-and-go landing in a series, after the crew forgot to extend the landing gear. The aircraft slid for more than  along the runway; instead of allowing the aircraft to stop the crew lifted it off again and it circled the airport to return for a landing with the gear extended. While circling, a fire broke out in the aircraft's rear fuselage, damaging its flight control systems. As the aircraft neared the ground it rolled left; the wing hit the ground and the aircraft crashed in a field, killing four of the seven crewmembers on board.
 On 2 January 2008, Iran Air Fokker 100 EP-IDB carrying 100 passengers skidded off the runway after its wing caught fire, when taking off for a domestic flight to Shiraz International Airport from Mehrabad Airport. No one was injured in the accident, which happened amid heavy snowfall at the airport.
 On 18 November 2009, Iran Air Fokker 100 EP-CFO suffered an undercarriage malfunction on take-off from Isfahan International Airport. The aircraft was on a flight to Mehrabad Airport, Tehran when the undercarriage failed to retract. The aircraft landed at Isfahan but was substantially damaged when the left main gear collapsed. There were no casualties in this event.
 On 15 January 2010, Iran Air Fokker 100 EP-IDA, operating Flight 223 was substantially damaged when the nose gear collapsed after landing at Isfahan International Airport. There were no casualties in this accident.
It was carrying 105 people, of whom at least 78 were killed.
 On 18 October 2011 a Boeing 727-200 (registration: EP-IRR) operating a flight from Moscow as Flight 742 landed with the nose landing gear jammed in the retracted position at Mehrabad International Airport. Nobody was hurt in the accident.
On 19 March 2019 a Fokker 100 (registration: EP-IDG) had an emergency landing with its main landing gear not extended at Mehrabad Airport. Nobody was hurt in the accident.

See also 

 Airlines of Iran
 Airports of Iran
 Iran Civil Aviation Organization
 Privatization in Iran
 Tourism in Iran
 Transport in Iran

References

External links

 Iran Air
 SkyGift Iran Air Frequent Flyer Club 
 The evolution of the Iranian airline industry

 
Airlines of Iran
Airlines banned in the European Union
Iranian brands
Airlines established in 1962
Government-owned airlines
Iranian companies established in 1962